The Naked Mind is a Canadian current affairs television miniseries on mental health which aired on CBC Television in 1974.

Premise
The series, hosted by Lorraine Thomson, featured drama segments to illustrate various mental health conditions. These were selected scenes from such plays as Anne of Green Gables, The Devil's Disciple, The Four Poster, Harvey, Johnny Belinda, My Fair Lady and Saint Joan. This was accompanied by discussion by a panel which represented various occupations such as sociologists, journalists, actors and theatrical leaders. Henry Morgan, a humorist, appeared on all episodes.

This series was based on a May 1973 hour-long special broadcast of the same name. Two of the four episodes were recorded in Halifax, the remainder in Toronto. A studio audience was present for each episode.

Scheduling
This half-hour series was broadcast on Mondays at 10:00 p.m. from 9 September to 7 October 1974.

References

External links
 
 

CBC Television original programming
1974 Canadian television series debuts
1974 Canadian television series endings
1970s Canadian television news shows
1970s Canadian television miniseries